Jericho Beach Music is a record label in Vancouver, British Columbia that specializes in world music, folk, and jazz. It was named after Jericho Beach in Vancouver. The label was formed in 1997 and released its first album, Compadres by James Keelaghan and Oscar Lopez. It is an imprint of Festival Distribution.

Roster
 Kim Barlow
 Geoff Berner
 Eric Bibb
 Lache Cerce
 Alpha Yaya Diallo
 Digging Roots
 e.S.L.
 David Francey
 Martyn Joseph
 James Keelaghan
 Khac Chi Ensemble
 Ndidi Onukwulu
 Po' Girl
 Silk Road Music
 Tanya Tagaq
 The Wailin' Jennys

See also 
 List of record labels

References

External links
 Catalog at Maple Music

Canadian independent record labels
Record labels established in 1997
Folk record labels
Jazz record labels
World music record labels
Bluegrass record labels